Esh or ESH may refer to:

 Esh, County Durham, a village in England
 Esh (letter) (Ʃ, ʃ), used in conjunction with the Latin alphabet
 Brighton City Airport, in England
 Eshtehardi language
 Environment, safety and health
 Esher railway station, Surrey, National Rail station code